Alexander Freeman (born 3 January 1970) is a former Liberian professional footballer.

A prominent midfielder, Freeman was a former player for Kelantan FA, Perlis FA, and Selangor FA in the Malaysian League. He is also a former Liberia national football team player from 1988–1997, who played at the 1996 African Cup of Nations.

References

External links

1970 births
Living people
Liberian footballers
Liberian expatriate footballers
Liberia international footballers
Liberian expatriate sportspeople in Malaysia
Expatriate footballers in Malaysia
1996 African Cup of Nations players
Perlis FA players
Expatriate footballers in Qatar
Al-Rayyan SC players
Qatar Stars League players
Expatriate footballers in Saudi Arabia
Al Nassr FC players
Saudi Professional League players
Sportspeople from Monrovia
Association football midfielders